Kim Seung-gyu (born 10 August 1967) is a South Korean judoka. He competed in the men's middleweight event at the 1988 Summer Olympics.

References

1967 births
Living people
South Korean male judoka
Olympic judoka of South Korea
Judoka at the 1988 Summer Olympics
Place of birth missing (living people)
Judoka at the 1990 Asian Games
Asian Games medalists in judo
Asian Games silver medalists for South Korea
Medalists at the 1990 Asian Games
20th-century South Korean people